Dedi III, nicknamed the Fat ( – 16 August 1190), a member of the House of Wettin, was Margrave of Lusatia from 1185 until his death.

Life 
Dedo was a younger son of the Wettin margrave Conrad I of Meissen and his wife Luitgard of Ravenstein. From 1144, he administered the lordship of Groitzsch as heir apparent of the late Count Henry of Groitzsch (d. 1135), and also as an adopted son of his aunt Bertha (d. 1143), Henry's sister and Groitzsch heiress. When Margrave Conrad retired in 1156, the extended Wettin estates were divided and Dedi formally received the County of Groitzsch and the Lordship of Rochlitz, with jurisdiction over the Bishopric of Naumburg.

Dedi participated in five campaigns of the Hohenstaufen emperor Frederick Barbarossa to Italy. In 1177, he served as Frederick's envoy to Pope Alexander III and swore, on Frederick's behalf, to uphold the Treaty of Venice, which ended the schism between pope and emperor.  

Back in Germany, Dedi appears to have spent most of his life in Rochlitz. Like his elder brother Margrave Otto II of Meissen, he encouraged the settlement of ethnic Germans in his territory.  He founded Wechselburg Priory as a private monastery, where he and his descendants were buried. Together with his elder brothers Margrave Otto II of Meissen and Margrave Theodoric I of Lusatia, he was a loyal supporter of Emperor Frederick in his conflict with the Welf duke Henry the Lion.

When his brother Theodoric I, who also styled himself a "Margrave of Landsberg", died in 1185, Dedi inherited his Lusatian possessions and by appointment of Emperor Frederick succeeded him as margrave. In the succession dispute in Meissen upon the death of Margrave Otto II in 1190, Dedi and his sons sided with their cousin Albert the Proud.

In order to get into shape for participating in the Third Crusade, Dedi had his doctors attempt a liposuction.  The operation was botched, and as a result, Dedi died on 16 August 1190.

Marriage and issue 
Dedi married Matilda of Heinsberg and had six children with her:
 Dietrich (before 13 September 1159; – 13 June 1207), Count of Sommerschenburg and Groitzsch and later provost of Magdeburg
 Philip, provost of Xanten (1182-1190)
 Conrad II (after 13 September 1159 – 6 May 1210), Margrave of Lusatia
 Henry (d. 1174)
 Goswin (d. 1174)
 Agnes ( –  24/26 March 1195)

Dedi was the grandfather of Saint Hedwig of Silesia and great-grandfather of the French prince Philip Hurepel. He was also a great-grandfather of Elizabeth of Hungary via Gertrude of Merania.

References 
 

Margraves of Lusatia
House of Wettin
People from Eilenburg
12th-century births
1190 deaths
Year of birth unknown
12th-century German nobility